Chinna Chintakunta is the Mandal headquarters which is part of Palamur (Mahbubnagar) district, Telangana.

References 

Villages in Mahbubnagar district